Mats Strandberg (born 1976) is a Swedish author.

Strandberg has been a columnist in Aftonbladet.
His debut novel was Jaktsäsong, published in 2006.  His young adult fantasy novel Cirkeln, the first book in the Engelsfors trilogy written together with Sara Bergmark Elfgren and published in 2011, was an August Prize nominee in the youth literature category.

Strandberg has also written horror novels. In 2015, his novel Färjan, which is set on board a Baltic Sea cruiseferry, was published. It was translated into English as Blood Cruise and published in the UK by Jo Fletcher Books. Hemmet, about a residential care home haunted by ghosts, was published in 2017; Slutet, a preapocalyptic young adult novel about the final few weeks of life on Earth before a comet destroys all life, was released in 2018 and received very positive reviews in Dagens Nyheter and SVT.

Strandberg is married to the actor Johan Ehn.

Bibliography 
 Jaktsäsong, 2006
 Bekantas bekanta, 2007
 Halva liv, 2009
 The Engelsfors trilogy (with Sara Bergmark Elfgren)
 Cirkeln, 2011; published in English as The Circle, 2012
 Eld, 2012; published in English as Fire, 2014
 Nyckeln, 2013; published in English as The Key, 2015
 Färjan, 2015; published in English as Blood Cruise, 2017
 Hemmet, 2017; published in English as The Home, 2020
 Slutet, 2018; published in English as The End, 2020

External links

References 

Swedish male writers
Swedish journalists
Living people
1976 births